The government of the German Democratic Republic (GDR) conducted a decades long program of coercive administration and distribution of performance-enhancing drugs, initially testosterone, later mainly anabolic drugs to its elite athletes. The aim of this program was to bolster the state image and prestige by winning medals in international competition such as the Olympic Games. The East German doping system started in the 1960s.

The system was extremely formalised and heavily based on a notion of secrecy. On a performance level, the system was successful. East German athletes were part of the elite and the country achieved successes. However, the doping system negatively affected the health of numerous athletes over time.

History

Sports as a tool to gain legitimacy

After the building of the Berlin wall, the East German dictatorship wanted to gain international recognition. Sports was targeted by the government as a possible tool for this. Manfred Ewald who became minister of sport in 1961 initiated the doping system. The first and major reform adopted by the government regarding sports in East Germany was the high-performance directive so-called Leistungssportbeschluss in 1969. The aim of the reform was the division of disciplines in two main categories, respectively Sport 1 and Sport 2. The disciplines stamped Sport 1 were supported and developed by the state. The reason was that sports such as swimming, rowing, and athleticism had the potential of Olympic glory. On the other hand, the disciplines stamped Sport 2 had no particular interest in the eyes of the state. Indeed, a sport like karate had no potential of Olympic glory. Many sports suffered from the directive as resources were taken from certain activities to finance the Sport 1.

The GDR made huge efforts to identify talents. Most children would compete in youth sport centers and be scouted by the government, which resulted in the best prospects being taken for the purpose of intense Olympic training. These children were expected to deliver great victories, and the state was willing to use anything at its disposal to ensure that. The advances in medicine and science meant that use of steroids, amphetamines, human growth hormones and blood boosting were common practice behind the scenes in training centers for professional athletes. The Sportvereinigung Dynamo (English: Sport Club Dynamo) was especially singled out as a center for doping in the former East Germany.

The 1970s marked the formalization of the doping system. Different performance-enhancing drugs already became available in 1966 for male athletes and 1968 for females. But the formalisation of the system only occurred after the remarkable performance of East Germany in the 1972 Summer Olympics where the GDR came third in the medal rankings. Using the formalized doping program, the East German state touted that their country with a mere 17–18 million population managed to defeat world powers through hard work and talented athletes.

After 1972, the International Olympic Committee (IOC) improved the detection of doping substances. As a result, in 1974, the  also known as the "uM group" was created in the GDR. Based on cutting-edge research, the goal of "uM" was to improve the effects of doping and to prevent any exposure of doping. Anabolic drugs such as Oral Turinabol became commonly available and the athletes began to consume those substances frequently. Predominant amongst these drugs were anabolic-androgenic steroids, such as Oral Turinabol, which was produced by the state-owned pharmaceuticals firm, Jenapharm.

During the following years, the country managed to assert dominance over different disciplines and multiple records were set by East German athletes. The 1980s gradually installed a climate of suspicion around the athletes. The IOC had begun to observe doubt regarding the performance. Doping control was reinforced and suspicion grew continuously. However, a mix between a lack of tools and knowledge made the investigations started by the IOC inefficient.

The system ended in the 1990s with the fall of the Berlin Wall. Multiple athletes and individuals involved came forward and a series of trials were organized against the figures of the East German doping system. Around 1,000 people were invited to testify in the trials, with 300 answering the call.

Systematic state doping

Jean-Pierre de Mondenard, an expert in performance-enhancing drugs, contended that doping existed in other countries both communist and capitalist, but the difference with East Germany was that it was a state policy.

The person in charge of the doping system was Dr. Manfred Höppner, a recognised East German sports doctor. He was appointed head of the "uM group" which was responsible to deliver the drugs to the federations. Each federation had a distinct uM group as the variety and dose differed with the disciplines.

The pervasiveness of the dealings of the uM work group and the element of secrecy it commanded in society, as well as the extent of abuse that athletes suffered because of it, have been noted by scholars and athletes alike. The state research program has been described as "a clandestine activity that demanded the collaboration of sports physicians, talented scientists and coaching experts under the watchful eye of the GDR Government". The involvement of GDR's Ministry of State Security (Stasi) in this doping program has also been well documented and highlights the extent to which the state went to secure the secrecy of the doping program. Indeed, athletes were often sworn to secrecy, not informed or deceived about the drugs they were taking; they were told instead that they were being given "vitamins". For example, Birgit Boese was just twelve years old when she became part of the doping program. She was instructed by her coach not to tell anyone about the vitamins, not even her parents. Ewald was quoted as having told coaches: "They're still so young and don't have to know everything."

Olympic success

The results of East German sportspeople appeared at the time to be an immense success: "Not until 1964, in Tokyo, did East German participants win more medals than their Western team colleagues." Four years later, in the 1968 Summer Olympics in Mexico City, where both German teams had a separate team but still a common flag and anthem, the GDR surpassed the West German (FRG) medal count. At these Olympics, the GDR, a country of 17 million, collected nine gold medals. This was repeated on 'enemy territory' at the 1972 Olympics in Munich; subsequently, the GDR never fell below third in the unofficial rankings. In Munich, the total was 20, and in 1976, it doubled again to 40. In the 1976 Olympic Games, East German athletes were ranked second in the medal count. They reiterated the performance four years later. The total medal count of GDR participants at the Winter and Summer Olympics from 1956 to 1988 amounted to 203 gold, 192 silver and 177 bronze.
While the doping worked in achieving victories for the state and advancing a relatively small nation to prominence on the world stage, many concerns remain. All victories by East German athletes are tainted due to the widespread use of drugs.

Effects on athletes

While the results of doping were impressive for East Germany in performance in sporting events, they were often devastating for the athletes involved: "While figures cannot be precise, the state-inspired doping program affected perhaps as many as 10,000 athletes. Not only was cheating at the center of the program, but so was the abuse of the athletes' health. Female athletes, including adolescents, experienced virilisation symptoms, and possibly as many as 1,000 sportsmen and -women suffered serious and lasting physical and psychological damage". One of them is former swimmer Rica Reinisch, a triple Olympic champion and world record-setter at the Moscow Games in 1980, has since suffered numerous miscarriages and recurring ovarian cysts.

Often, doping was carried out without the knowledge of the athletes, some of them as young as ten years of age. However, there is a heated debate. Recognised figures such as Werner Franke argued that doping can be qualified as a choice of the athletes.

The extent to which taking these drugs were solely responsible for the side effects is in some cases questionable; in some athletes may have had pre-existing or hereditary conditions. However, numerous potential side effects from steroid consumption are known, including "increased risk of cardiovascular disease, liver problems, violent mood swings, extreme masculinising effects in females and a clear link with certain forms of cancer". The health consequences of taking performing-enhancing drugs were known from as early as 1963, when a coach from Leipzig, Johanna Sperling, sent a letter to her athletes warning them against doping.

Discovery

At the same time, the Kreischa testing laboratory near Dresden passed into government control, which was reputed to administer around 12,000 tests a year on East German athletes, but without any being penalised.

The International Amateur Athletics Federation (IAAF) suspended Slupianek for 12 months, a penalty that ended two days before the European championships in Prague. In reverse of what the IAAF hoped, sending her home to East Germany meant that she was free to train unchecked with anabolic steroids, if she wanted to, and then compete for another gold medal, which indeed she won.

After the Slupianek affair, East German athletes were secretly tested before they left the country. Those who tested positive, were removed from international competition. Usually, such withdrawals were temporary, as they were intended to serve less as a punishment, but as a means to protect both the athlete and the East German team from international sanctions.

As it was, the media first in East Germany, and later outside, would usually be informed that the withdrawal was due to an injury sustained during training. If the athlete was being doped in secret, as was often the case, their doctor would usually be ordered to fabricate a medical condition so as to justify the withdrawal of the athlete. The justification was also served as such to the athlete. The results of East Germany's internal drug tests were never made public – almost nothing emerged from the East German sports schools and laboratories. A rare exception was the visit by the sports writer and former athlete Doug Gilbert of the Edmonton Sun, who said: Dr (Heinz) Wuschech knows more about anabolic steroids than any doctor I have ever met, and yet he cannot discuss them openly any more than Geoff Capes or Mac Wilkins can openly discuss them in the current climate of amateur sports regulation. What I did learn in East Germany was that they feel there is little danger from anabolica, as they call it, when the athletes are kept on strictly monitored programmes. Although the extremely dangerous side-effects are admitted, they are statistically no more likely to occur than side-effects from the birth control pill. If, that is, programmes are constantly medically monitored as to dosage.

Other reports came from the occasional athlete who fled to the West. There were fifteen escapees between 1976 and 1979. One, the ski-jumper Hans-Georg Aschenbach, said: "Long-distance skiers start having injections to their knees from the age 14 because of their intensive training." Aschenbach continued: "For every Olympic champion, there are at least 350 invalids. There are gymnasts among the girls who have to wear corsets from the age of 18 because their spine and their ligaments have become so worn... There are young people so worn out by the intensive training that they come out of it mentally blank [lessivés – washed out], which is even more painful than a deformed spine."

Then on 26 August 1993, well after the former GDR had disbanded itself to accede to the Federal Republic of Germany in 1990, the records were opened, and the evidence was there, that the Stasi, the GDR state secret police, supervised systematic doping of East German athletes from 1971 until reunification in 1990.

Virtually no East German athlete ever failed an official drugs test, though Stasi files show that many did indeed produce positive tests at Kreischa, the Saxon laboratory (German:Zentrales Dopingkontroll-Labor des Sportmedizinischen Dienstes) that was at the time approved by the International Olympic Committee, now called the Institute of Doping Analysis and Sports Biochemistry (IDAS).

Aftermath

The search for justice

Scholars have referred to the damaging side effects of steroid consumption to highlight that the GDR's regime was abusive and corrupt. 

In the 1990s, a special division of the criminal police, the Central Investigations Office for Government and Reunification Crimes (ZERV), was charged with investigating doping crimes. Of the 1,000 athletes invited to testify by ZERV, only 300 actually testified. While the absence of 700 athletes invited suggests that they may indeed have wittingly played an active role in the doping system and therefore refused to testify, it is conceivable that some did not want the public exposure or did not feel that they had suffered at the hands of the regime.

Many former doctors and former athletes struggling with the side effects are bringing sports directors to court. Many former club officials of Sportsvereinigung Dynamo and some athletes found themselves charged after the dissolution of the GDR. For example, two former Dynamo Berlin club doctors, Dieter Binus, chief of the national women's team from 1976 to 1980, and Bernd Pansold, in charge of the sports medicine centre in East Berlin, were committed for trial for allegedly supplying 19 teenagers with illegal substances. Binus was sentenced in August, Pansold in December 1998 after both being found guilty of administering hormones to underage female athletes from 1975 to 1984. Daniela Hunger and Andrea Pollack are the former Sport Club Dynamo athletes who publicly came forward and admitted to doping, accused their coaches. Manfred Ewald, who had imposed blanket doping in East Germany, was given a 22-month suspended sentence to the outrage of his victims.

Based on an admission given by Andrea Pollack, the United States Olympic Committee asked for the redistribution of gold medals won in the 1976 Summer Olympics. Despite court rulings in Germany about substantial claims of systematic doping by some East German swimmers, the IOC executive board announced that it has no intention of revising the Olympic record books. In rejecting the American petition on behalf of its women's medley relay team in Montreal and a similar petition from the British Olympic Association on behalf of Sharron Davies, the IOC made it clear that it wanted to discourage any such appeals in the future.

In recent years, former athletes of the GDR who were administered drugs and suffered adverse effects have been able to seek financial compensation. The association doping-opfer-file fights for the recognition of East German athletes as victim of doping. As a result of their campaign, they registered a first success, with the German government awarding 10.5 million euros to the athletes.

On 28 June 2016 the German Bundestag passed into law the Second Doping Victims Assistance Act. As a result, a fund of 13.65 million euros was set up, from which financial assistance is granted to victims of doping in the former GDR. In this act, athletes are defined as victims, and may be entitled to financial assistance, if they have suffered significant damage to health.

Documentation 

In 1991, Brigitte Berendonk and the late Werner Franke, two opponents of the doping, published several theses which had been drafted former researchers in the GDR doping products which were at the Military Medical Academy Bad Saarow. Top-secret research documents and government reports obtained after the fall of the GDR showed that the state sponsored large doping research programs involving hundreds of scientists carrying out doping research on thousands of athletes.  Particular attention was paid to doping women and adolescent girls because they gained the most advantage from doping.  In addition to doping research, research on evading doping detection was carried out.

Based on this work, they were able to document a state-run doping program, which included many great athletes such as Marita Koch and Heike Drechsler. Both  denied the allegations, but Berendonk won a 1993 lawsuit in which Drechsler accused her of lying.

Significant cases

Renate Neufeld 

In 1977, one of East Germany's best sprinters, Renate Neufeld, fled to the West with the Bulgarian she later married. A year later she said that she had been told to take drugs supplied by coaches while training to represent East Germany in the 1980 Olympic Games.

At 17, I joined the East Berlin Sports Institute. My speciality was the 80m hurdles. We swore that we would never speak to anyone about our training methods, including our parents. The training was very hard. We were all watched. We signed a register each time we left for dormitory and we had to say where we were going and what time we would return. One day, my trainer, Günter Clam, advised me to take pills to improve my performance: I was running 200m in 24 seconds. My trainer told me the pills were vitamins, but I soon had cramps in my legs, my voice became gruff and sometimes I couldn't talk any more. Then I started to grow a moustache and my periods stopped. I then refused to take these pills. One morning in October 1977, the secret police took me at 7am and questioned me about my refusal to take pills prescribed by the trainer. I then decided to flee, with my fiancé.

She brought with her to the West grey tablets and green powder she said had been given to her, to members of her club, and to other athletes. The West German doping analyst Manfred Donike reportedly identified them as anabolic steroids. She said she stayed quiet for a year for the sake of her family. But when her father then lost his job and her sister was expelled from her handball club, she decided to tell her story.

Andreas Krieger 

Andreas Krieger, then known as Heidi Krieger, competed as a woman in the East German athletics team, winning the gold medal for shot put in the 1986 European Championships in Athletics.

From the age of 16 onward, Krieger was systematically doped with anabolic steroids, which have significant androgenic effects on the body. He had already had doubts about his gender identity, and the chemical changes resulting from the steroids only exacerbated them. In 1997, some years after retirement, Krieger underwent sex reassignment surgery and changed his name to Andreas.

At the trial of Manfred Ewald, leader of the East German sports program and president of his East Germany's Olympic committee and Manfred Hoeppner, East German medical director in Berlin in 2000, Krieger testified that the drugs he had been given had contributed to his trans-sexuality; he already had thoughts about it, but in his words the effects of the doping deprived him of the right to "find out for myself which sex I wanted to be."

Christian Schenk 

There has been particular media attention and controversy surrounding the case of the former GDR decathlete, Christian Schenk. Schenk's case highlights that not all athletes unwittingly took performance-enhancing drugs. Schenk admitted that he knowingly used them, but he has suggested that he will assess a possible application for compensation from the fund set up by the Second Doping Act, because he now suffers from severe depression and bipolar disorder. Although Schenk admitted in an interview that his illnesses might be hereditary, his conditions are known to be side effects of taking performance-enhancing drugs. Given that Schenk has ostensibly suffered health damage due to doping, there has been particular debate surrounding the extent to which he and other athletes with similar alternative experiences should be regarded a victim of doping. This negatively affected many people.

See also

East Germany national athletics team

References

External links 

 Secrets of the Dead episode "Doping for Gold"

Doping by country
Sport in East Germany
History of East Germany
Drugs in sport in Germany
Sports scandals in Germany